UFC Fight Night: Overeem vs. Harris was a planned mixed martial arts event produced by the Ultimate Fighting Championship originally planned to take place on April 11, 2020 at Moda Center in Portland, Oregon, United States. Due to the COVID-19 pandemic, the event was eventually postponed (see section below).

Background
The event was expected to be the third that the organization hosted in Portland, following UFC 102 in August 2009 and UFC Fight Night: Lineker vs. Dodson in October 2016. 

A heavyweight bout between the former 2010 K-1 World Grand Prix Champion, Strikeforce Heavyweight Champion and UFC Heavyweight Championship challenger Alistair Overeem and Walt Harris was expected to serve as the event headliner. The pairing had previously been scheduled to headline UFC on ESPN: Overeem vs. Rozenstruik on December 7, 2019 but Harris pulled out of the fight in early November, citing the disappearance and death of his stepdaughter in her home state of Alabama.

A middleweight bout between Abu Azaitar and Alessio Di Chirico was scheduled for the event. However, Azaitar was pulled from the event for an undisclosed reason and replaced by Markus Perez.

A middleweight bout between Derek Brunson and Edmen Shahbazyan was initially scheduled for UFC 248. However, it was announced on February 20 that the bout had been rescheduled and would serve as the co-headliner for this event.

COVID-19 pandemic
Due to the COVID-19 pandemic, Oregon governor Kate Brown issued an order restricting mass gatherings and sporting events on March 12, thus the UFC decided to move the event to Las Vegas where it would take place behind closed doors at the UFC APEX facility. UFC president Dana White then announced on March 15 that this event would have to be moved once again as the Nevada State Athletic Commission (NSAC) decided to provisionally ban events until March 25, when a new meeting would discuss future plans in what could jeopardize this event's realization. On March 16, it was confirmed that the event was postponed after a letter from White to employees was shared to the public. This was the first time that the promotion was forced to cancel events due to vis major. The UFC also cancelled two events scheduled for March 21 and 28. White assured on March 24 that all cancelled fights will be rescheduled for future events.

Cancelled fight card

See also 

 List of UFC events
 List of current UFC fighters
 2020 in UFC

References 
 

UFC Fight Night
2020 in sports in Oregon
Mixed martial arts in Oregon
Sports in Portland, Oregon
April 2020 sports events in the United States
2020 in mixed martial arts
Cancelled Ultimate Fighting Championship events
Sports events cancelled due to the COVID-19 pandemic